Zulfiqar Ali Behan is a Pakistani politician who has been a member of the National Assembly of Pakistan since August 2018. Previously he was a member of the National Assembly from August 2014 to January to 2016.

Political career
He ran for the seat of the National Assembly of Pakistan as a candidate of Pakistan Peoples Party (PPP) from Constituency NA-211 (Naushero Feroze-I) in 2013 Pakistani general election but was unsuccessful. He challenged the successful election of Ghulam Murtaza Jatoi. In August 2014, an election tribunal declared election of Ghulam Murtaza Jatoi void and declared Behan as candidate returned to the National Assembly from Constituency NA-211 (Naushero Feroze-I). In January 2016, the Supreme Court of Pakistan annulled the verdict of the Election Tribunal and restored the National Assembly membership of Ghulam Murtaza Jatoi.

He was re-elected to the National Assembly as a candidate of PPP from Constituency NA-212 (Naushahro Feroze-II) in 2018 Pakistani general election.

References

Living people
Pakistan People's Party politicians
Pakistani MNAs 2013–2018
Pakistani MNAs 2018–2023
Year of birth missing (living people)